Reinelde Knapp (born 8 February 1933) is an Austrian athlete. She competed in the women's high jump at the 1956 Summer Olympics.

References

1933 births
Living people
Athletes (track and field) at the 1956 Summer Olympics
Austrian female high jumpers
Olympic athletes of Austria
Sportspeople from Vorarlberg
People from Bludenz District